Ric Huang (born Jan Shan-liang 6 September 1968) is a Taiwanese singer and actor.

As an actor, Huang is known for his appearances on Pili, and has also played recurring characters on Borrow Your Love and When I See You Again. He is a Mandopop and Hokkien pop singer-songwriter, and in 2012, won the Golden Melody Award for Best Taiwanese Male Singer. The next year, Huang performed at the Golden Melody Award ceremony. Huang has performed at the  Pier 2 Arts Center in Kaohsiung, Riverside Live House in Taipei, as well as Legacy Taipei, and the affiliated Legacy Taichung.

References

External links

1968 births
Living people
Taiwanese male singers
Taiwanese Mandopop singer-songwriters
Taiwanese Hokkien pop singers
21st-century Taiwanese male actors
Taiwanese male television actors